Grouches-Luchuel is a commune in the Somme department in Hauts-de-France in northern France.

Geography
A small stream, a tributary of the Authie, separates the two parts of the commune.

Population

Places of interest
 Saint-Brice's chapel at Luchuel
 The church at  Grouches

See also
Communes of the Somme department

References

Communes of Somme (department)